Soyuz-2 (GRAU index 14A14) is a modernized version of the Soviet Soyuz rocket. In its basic form, it is a three-stage launch vehicle for placing payloads into low Earth orbit. Compared to the previous versions of the Soyuz, the first-stage boosters and two core stages feature uprated engines with improved injection systems. Digital flight control and telemetry systems allow the rocket to be launched from a fixed launch platform, whereas the launch platforms for earlier Soyuz rockets had to be rotated as the rocket could not perform a roll to change its heading in flight.

Soyuz-2 is often flown with an upper stage, which allows it to lift payloads into higher orbits, such as Molniya and geosynchronous orbits. The upper stage is equipped with independent flight control and telemetry systems from those used in the rest of the rocket. The NPO Lavochkin manufactured Fregat is the most commonly used upper stage.

Soyuz-2 rockets were first launched from Site 31 at the Baikonur Cosmodrome, and Site 43 at the Plesetsk Cosmodrome, launch facilities shared with earlier R-7 derived rockets including the Soyuz-U and Molniya. Commercial Soyuz-2 flights are contracted by Starsem and have launched from Site 31 at Baikonur Cosmodrome and Ensemble de Lancement Soyouz (ELS), which has been built at the Centre Spatial Guyanais on the northern coast of South America. The Soyuz-2 version ST-B can deliver  to geostationary transfer orbit (GTO) from this equatorial site. In 2016, the new Vostochny Cosmodrome started operating Soyuz-2 flights as well, from its first launch pad called Vostochny Cosmodrome Site 1S.

The Soyuz-2 has replaced the Molniya-M, Soyuz-U and Soyuz-FG since 2010, 2017 and 2019 respectively. TsSKB-Progress halted production of Soyuz-U in April 2015; the final flight of a Soyuz-U rocket took place on 22 February 2017, carrying Progress MS-05 to the International Space Station (ISS). According to CNES officials interviewed in May 2018, launches of Soyuz from Centre Spatial Guyanais may be replaced by the Ariane 6 medium-lift version A62 in 2021, but later moved back to 2022 or later.

Variants 
The Soyuz-2 family includes 2.1a, 2.1b, and 2.1v. The first two variants are modifications to the Soyuz-U launcher. The latter is a "light" version without side boosters. When launched from the Centre Spatial Guyanais site, Soyuz-2 is always mated with the ST-type fairing; this version is called Soyuz-ST or Soyuz-STK, where additional "K" indicates special measures taken for preparing and launching the rocket in hot and humid conditions.

Soyuz-2.1a 
The 2.1a version includes conversion from analog to digital flight control system and uprated engines on the booster and the first stage with improved injection systems. The new digital flight control and telemetry systems allow the rocket to launch from a fixed rather than angled launch platform and adjust its heading in flight. A digital control system also enables the launch of larger commercial satellites with wider and longer payload fairings such as the ST-type fairing. These fairings introduce too much aerodynamic instability for the old analog system to handle. This stage continues to use the RD-0110 engine. The 2.1a/ST version is sometimes called Soyuz ST-A. The first launch, from Guiana, (17 December 2011 for Pléiades-HR 1A, SSOT, ELISA (4 satellites)) was a success.

Soyuz-2.1b 
The 2.1b version adds an upgraded engine (RD-0124) which greatly increases the specific impulse of the upper stage (326 seconds to 359 seconds), and hence improves payload capability from 7 tonnes to 8.2 tonnes. First launch took place from Plesetsk Cosmodrome Site 43 on 26 July 2008 with a classified military payload. The 2.1b/ST version is sometimes called Soyuz ST-B. The first launch, from Centre Spatial Guyanais, was a success (21 October 2011), for the first two Galileo IOV satellites.

Soyuz-2.1v 

The first flight vehicle of the 2.1v version was finished in 2009. It is a "light" version of the Soyuz-2 without the side boosters (blocks B, V, G and D ). The new launcher version was able to deliver up to 2.8 tonnes in low Earth orbit.

Modifications for various launch sites 

The Soyuz-2.1a/1b versions launched from the Vostochny Cosmodrome and the Centre Spatial Guyanais have a series of modifications over the stock units. Some of these might later be implemented on all the Soyuz-2, while some are particular requirements to the space port design.

Modifications for the Centre Spatial Guyanais (CSG) version includes:
 First use of a mobile service tower at the ELS that enabled vertical payload integration.
 European supplied payload adapters.
 European supplied KSE, a system to locate and transmit a flight termination signal. It would activate the engine shutdown command and leave the vehicle in a ballistic trajectory.
 Adaptation of the S-Band telemetry system on all stages from the 5 TM bands available at Baikonur, and Plesetsk to the 3 allowed at the CSG range.
 Adaptation of the S-Band telemetry coding and frequency to the IRIG standard used at CSG.
 Adaptation of the oxygen purge system for directing to the outside the mobile gantry.
 Adaptation to the tropical CSG climate including the adaptation of the air conditioning system to local specifications and protective measures to avoid icing. All holes and cavities were studied and certified to be adequately protected against intrusion of insects and rodents.
 The four boosters and the core stage were upgraded with pyrotechnic devices to breach the fuel tanks to assure that they would sink in the ocean. The other stages were shown to lose structural integrity on impact and thus proven to sink.
 At least initially, the boosters and core stage would use the pyrotechnically ignited 14D22 (RD-107A) and 14D23 (RD-108A) rather than the chemically ignited 14D22 kHz and 14D23 kHz used on the rest of the Soyuz-2.

Modifications for the Vostochny Cosmodrome version includes:
 New and upgraded computer, N.A.Semikhatov NPO Automatika's Malachite-7, with six times more performance, better obsolescence protection, reduced weight.
 The new computer enabled a significant reduction on the cable network complexity thanks to multiplexing lines and using common buses.
 New nickel-cadmium batteries that eliminate the need for a dedicated battery charging station.
 The inclusion of on-board video system, that will enable real-time views of the launch.
 Since the launch pad at Vostochny also has a mobile gantry for vertical payload integration, similar to the ELS at Guiana, it has the necessary piping to direct the oxygen purges outside the gantry.

On 1 October 2015, it was announced that parts of the assembly complex for the Soyuz-2 at Vostochny Cosmodrome were designed for a different modification of the rocket and are too small, so that the planned first launch in December 2015 was under question. The first launch occurred on 28 April 2016 at 02:01:21 UTC.

Notable missions

Suborbital test flight 
On 8 November 2004, at 18:30 UTC, the first Soyuz-2 carrier rocket, in the Soyuz-2.1a configuration, was launched from the Plesetsk Cosmodrome in Russia. The rocket followed a sub-orbital trajectory, with the third stage and boilerplate payload re-entering over the Pacific Ocean.

Maiden launch 
The first attempt at launching a Soyuz-2 to orbit, with the MetOp-A satellite, occurred on 17 July 2006. It was scrubbed two hours before the launch by an automatic sequence, after the onboard computer failed to check the launch azimuth. Fuelling of the rocket was underway at the time, and all launch complex equipment and on-board preliminary checks had proceeded without incident. The rocket was left fuelled on the launch pad, for the next attempt on 18 July 2006. Launch was eventually conducted on 19 October 2006.

First crewed mission 
First crewed launch of Soyuz-2 took place at 9 April 2020, carrying Soyuz MS-16 to the ISS.

Naphthyl fuel 
Following successful ground testing, a naphthyl fueled Soyuz-2.1b launch took place on 22 October 2022 at Vostochny. Naphthyl is an environmentally safe hydrocarbon fuel with fewer aromatic compounds than kerosene, that also slightly improves engine performance. There are only minor differences in thermal properties, viscosity, and surface tension, so this did not require significant engine changes.

Launch statistics 
Since 2006, Soyuz-2 rockets have accumulated a total of 155  launches, 148  of which were successful, yielding a   success rate.

Launch outcomes

Launch sites

List of launches

Planned launches

See also 

 Soyuz programme
 List of R-7 launches
 Medium-lift launch vehicle

Notes

References

External links 

 Encyclopedia Astronautica article on Soyuz 2.1
 Encyclopedia Astronautica article on Soyuz 2.1/Fregat
 European Space Agency about Soyuz-ST (Russian name Soyuz-STK)
 Soyuz User's Manual, from Starsem
 Soyuz-2 launch vehicle, from Roscosmos

R-7 (rocket family)
Space launch vehicles of Russia
Vehicles introduced in 2004